Illinois Route 138 is a state highway in southwestern Illinois. It runs from Illinois Route 159 north of Bunker Hill to the city of Mount Olive at Illinois Street, a former alignment of U.S. Route 66.

Route description 
Illinois 138 runs east–west, with a bend north through the city of Benld. It is a two-lane surface road for its entire length. South of Benld, it also overlaps Illinois Route 4 for a few miles.

History 
SBI Route 138 ran from Mount Carmel to Grayville; in 1937, this became Illinois Route 1. It was put on its current alignment in 1942, replacing parts of Illinois Route 38.

Major intersections

References

External links

138
Transportation in Macoupin County, Illinois